Midas (IMO 9002659)  is a Ro-Ro cargo ship operated by Godby Shipping of Åland.

The main engine is a Wartsila Vasa 9R32e, 3.645 KW diesel engine, which runs with a 540 KW shaft generator. The fuel tank has a capacity of 360 cubic metres of oil.  The main deck has an area of 1257 square metres while the weather deck has an area of 1040 square metres.

Operational History 
It operates around Europe and the Caribbean at an average speed of about 14 knots.

In November 2020 MV Midas rescued the crew of a yacht that had capsized off the coast of Portugal. Whilst the seas were initially too rough to launch Midas' rescue boats, the following morning they were calmer and the three sailors were taken aboard from their life raft. The survivors were taken to the Azores Islands.

In November 2022 MV Midas was chartered to Condor Ferries following Commodore Goodwill suffering damage during drydocking in Spain.

In December 2022 the ship was chartered to Stena Line for the Travemunde to Liepaja route.

References

1990 ships
Ships of Finland
Cargo ships
Ships built in Hamburg